This article is about music-related events in 1837.

Events 
March 31 – Franz Liszt and Sigismond Thalberg play a musical 'duel' at a charity event for refugees of the Italian war of independence at the home of Countess Belgiojoso.
June 11 – Prussian Copyright Act protecting for the first time performances of concert music
Pauline Viardot (as Pauline García) makes her concert debut at the age of sixteen.

Publications
François-Joseph Fétis – Traité du chant en choeur (Paris)

Published popular music 
 "Hark, Brothers, Hark", words and music by John Hill Hewitt
 "Woodman, Spare That Tree!", words by George Pope Morris, music by Henry Russell

Classical music 
Charles-Valentin Alkan – 3 Morceaux dans le genre pathétique, Op. 15
Ludwig Berger – 15 Etudes, Op.33
Charles-Auguste de Bériot – Violin Concerto No. 1, Op.16
Hector Berlioz – Grande Messe des Morts
Frédéric Chopin 
Hexaméron: Variation No. 6
Nocturne in C minor, B. 108
Largo in E-flat major, B. 109
Impromptu No. 1, Op. 29
Scherzo No. 2, Op. 31
Piano Sonata No. 2, Op. 35, III
Fanny Ellsler – 3 Airs de Ballet
Adolf von Henselt 
Romance, Op. 10
Variations de concert sur le motif de l'opéra 'L'elisir d'amore''', Op. 1
Franz Liszt Grandes études, S. 137Album d'un voyageur, S. 156Hexaméron, S. 392Soirées musicales de Rossini, S. 424
12 Lieder von Franz Schubert, S. 558
Felix Mendelssohn
6 Gesänge, Op.34
Piano Concerto No. 2 in D minor, Op. 40Psalm 42 for choir and orchestra, Op. 42
6 Lieder, Op. 50
String Quartet No. 4 in E minor
Carl Gottlieb Reissiger 
3 String Quartets, Op.111
4 Gesänge, Op.117
Robert Schumann
Davidsbündlertänze, Op. 6
Études symphoniques, Op. 13
Johann Strauss Sr. – Cachucha-Galopp, Op.97
Sigismond Thalberg 
12 Etudes, Op.26
Grand Fantasia on 'God save the Queen' and 'Rule Britannia', Op.27

 Opera 
Daniel Auber – The Black Domino (with libretto by Eugène Scribe)
Gaetano Donizetti – Roberto DevereuxMikhail Glinka – Ruslan and Lyudmila (composition began, premiered in 1842)
Albert Lortzing – Zar und ZimmermannGaspare Spontini – Agnes von Hohenstaufen Births 
January 2 – Mily Balakirev, Russian pianist, conductor and composer (d. 1910)
January 12 – Adolf Jensen, German pianist, composer and music teacher (d. 1879)
January 27 – Carlotta Ferrari, composer (died 1907)
February 23 – Rosalía de Castro, lyricist (died 1885)
March 12 – Alexandre Guilmant, organist (died 1911)
March 15 – Célestine Galli-Marié, operatic mezzo-soprano, the original Carmen (d. 1905)
April 13 – Julius Weissenborn, German bassoonist, music teacher and composer (d. 1888)
April 18 – Armand Silvestre, librettist (died 1901)
May 23 – Józef Wieniawski, pianist (died 1912)
June 1 – Ferdinand Quentin Dulcken, English (later American) pianist and composer (d. 1901)
June 25 – Josef Werner, composer (died 1922)
July 6 – Władysław Żeleński, composer (died 1921)
July 30 – Signe Hebbe, operatic soprano (d. 1925)
August 24 
Théodore Dubois, organist and composer (d. 1924)
Adolf Wilbrandt, writer and lyricist (died 1911)
September 19 – Adolf Gustaw Sonnenfeld, composer (died 1914)
December 7 – Édouard Mangin, musician (died 1907)
December 9 – Emile Waldteufel, composer (d. 1915)
December 24 – Cosima Wagner, daughter of Franz Liszt and wife of Richard Wagner (d. 1930)
December 30 – Ida Marie Lipsius, music writer (d. 1927)date unknownKate Santley, actress and singer (d. 1923)
La Serneta, flamenco singer (d. 1910) 

 Deaths 
January 23 – John Field, pianist and composer (b. 1782)
February 10 – Aleksandr Pushkin, Russian poet and librettist (born 1799)
April 9 – Polly Cuninghame, ballet dancer (b. c. 1785)
May 5  
Niccolò Antonio Zingarelli, composer (b. 1752)
Salvatore Fighera, composer (b. 1771)
June 16 – Valentino Fioravanti, opera buffa composer (b. 1764)
July 28 – Joseph Schubert, violinist and composer (b. 1754)
August 6 – Johann Nepomuk Schelble, composer (b. 1789)
October 6 – Jean François Lesueur, composer (b. 1760/1763)
October 11 – Samuel Wesley, organist and composer, son of hymn-writer Charles Wesley
October 17 – Johann Nepomuk Hummel, composer (b. 1778)
October 28 – Jean-Blaise Martin, opera singer (b. 1768)date unknown''
Franz Joseph Antony, organist and choral composer (b. 1790)
Jean Théodore Latour, composer for piano (b. 1766)
Christina Rahm, opera singer (b. c. 1760) 

 
19th century in music
Music by year